Rabiha Diab (1954 – April 2016) from Dura al-Qar' was a politician and a member of Fatah. She was the Minister of Women’s Affairs in the Palestinian Authority Government of May 2009 and in the successive governments of 2013-2014. Diab previously held the positions of Member of the Governments of Palestinian Legislative Council and of Assistant Undersecretary of the Ministry of Youth and Sports.

Early life and education
Diab was awarded a Bachelor of Arts in Sociology and Social Service in 1999 in Bethlehem, Palestine.

References

External links
Ministry of Women Affairs, State of Palestine

1954 births
2016 deaths
Women's ministers
21st-century women politicians
Government ministers of the State of Palestine
Government ministers of the Palestinian National Authority
Women government ministers of the Palestinian National Authority
Members of the 2006 Palestinian Legislative Council